Filip Eidsheim (born 16 February 1990) is a Norwegian former professional cyclist.

Major results

2008
 2nd Time trial, National Junior Road Championships
2010
 1st Stage 4 Tour des Pyrénées
2011
 3rd Dwars door de Antwerpse Kempen
2012
 4th ZLM Tour
 10th Ronde van Vlaanderen U23
2013
 8th Skive–Løbet
2014
 2nd Road race, National Road Championships
 3rd Central European Tour Szerencs–Ibrány
 5th Central European Tour Košice–Miskolc
 10th Trofej Umag
2015
 Tour du Maroc
1st Stages 9 & 10
 6th GP Viborg

References

External links

1990 births
Living people
Norwegian male cyclists